Adam Christopher Allskog (born 14 March 2001), better known as Adam Woods, is a Swedish singer. He participated in Melodifestivalen 2023 with the song  "Where You Are (Sávežan)" along with the lead singer Jon Henrik Fjällgren and Arc North.

Discography

Singles

References

External links 

2001 births
Swedish singers
Melodifestivalen contestants of 2023
Living people